The Banque du Développement du Mali (Mali Development Bank in English) is a subsidiary of the Moroccan bank BMCE.

References 

Banks of Mali